Forever for Now is the third studio album by American singer-songwriter LP. The album was released through Warner Bros. Records in June 2014, and is their major label full-length debut.

Background
LP released two independent studio albums, Heart-Shaped Scar (2001) and Suburban Sprawl & Alcohol (2004), which were commercially unsuccessful. After that, they started writing songs for other artists, most notably for Rihanna ("Cheers (Drink to That)"), Backstreet Boys, and Christina Aguilera.

Following a record deal signed with Warner Bros. Records in September 2011, LP recorded a song titled "Into the Wild", which was prominently used in a Citibank TV commercial in the end of 2011. In April 2012, LP released an extended play Into the Wild: Live at EastWest Studios, and "Into the Wild" was released as a single in May 2012. LP started touring, which pushed the release of their major-label debut album back.
Initially, the album was going to sound as "a bit more of an acoustic thing," however, LP and producer Rob Cavallo started adding more layers to the songs, and eventually their sound grew bigger.

Promotion
The first official single to promote Forever for Now, "Night Like This", was released on March 28, 2014. "Someday" was released as the second single on June 3, 2014.

On June 17, 2014, LP performed on The Late Late Show with Craig Ferguson, broadcast by CBS.

Critical reception

Stephen Thomas Erlewine of AllMusic rated the album four out of five stars, and wrote that "there's a sharp, stylish gleam to the very sound of Forever for Now, a combination of LP's savvy pop sensibility and the cool commercial instincts of Rob Cavallo." He added that Cavallo "accentuates and accessorizes the contours of her [LP's] songs without diluting the eccentricities. He gives her plenty of space to roam, allowing her to soar as high as a skyscraper on 'Tokyo Sunrise' and 'Salvation,' but also knows when to keep things intimate, as on the haunting coda of the title track."

American Songwriters Jim Beviglia wrote that "Forever for Now is filled with sprawling pop songs that soar to heights meant to maximize the impact of Pergolizzi's unreal voice," which he compared to a cross between Ronnie Spector and Florence Welch. However, he commented that the album's main drawback is the fact that almost every song seems to be "meticulously crafted and ready for radio airplay," as listening to the entire album "reveals a certain sameness in approach: Quiet, atmospheric opens, cloud-bursting choruses, and a few of LP's wordless banshee wails thrown in for good measure."

Track listing

Videoclip
1. Tokyo Sunrise
2.

Personnel
Credits adapted from AllMusic.

Musicians
LP – lead vocals, ukulele
Kid Harpoon – ukulele
Rob Cavallo – guitar
Yogi Lonich – guitar
Tim Pierce – guitar
Justyn Pilbrow – bass, guitar
Mike Elizondo – bass
Chris Chaney – bass, drums
Oliver Charles – drums, percussion
Gary Novak – drums, percussion
Luis Conte – percussion
Isabella Summers – keyboards, piano, synthesizer, percussion
Jamie Muhoberac – keyboards
Charlie Bisharat – violin
Caroline Campbell – violin
Vanessa Freebairn-Smith – cello
Dane Little – cello
David Campbell – string arrangements, string conductor
Oliver Langford – string arrangements

Technical personnel
Rob Cavallo – production, additional production, A&R
Josh Alexander – production, vocal production
Mike Del Rio – production, programming
PJ Bianco – production, programming
Tim Pagnotta – production
Justyn Pilbrow – production
Isabella Summers – production
David Bassett – additional production
Claude Kelly – vocal production
Cheryl Jenets – production manager
Jon Chen – production assistant
Michelle Rogel – production assistant
Dan Chase – engineering, programming
Doug McKean – engineering, programming
Allen Casillas – engineering
Chris Mullings – engineering
Wesley Seidman – engineering, assistant engineering
Brendan Dekora – assistant engineering
Rouble Kapoor – assistant engineering
Jeremy Miller – assistant engineering

Scott Moore – assistant engineering
Tom Rasulo – assistant engineering
Ryan Reault – assistant engineering
Lance Sumner – assistant engineering
Russ Waugh – assistant engineering
Serban Ghenea – mixing
John Hanes – mixing
Chris Lord-Alge – mixing
Andrew Schubert – mixing
Brad Townsend – mixing
Keith Armstrong – mixing assistant
Nik Karpen – mixing assistant
Bob Ludwig – mastering
Mike Fasano – drum technician
Jerry Johnson – drum technician
Mauro Rubbi – drum technician
Jeff Fenster – A&R
Lars Fox – Pro-Tools
Norman Wonderly – creative director
Amanda Demme – photography
Donny Phillips – design

Charts

Release history

References

2014 albums
LP (singer) albums
Warner Records albums